Gibloux is a municipality in the district of Sarine in the canton of Fribourg in Switzerland. The municipality was formed 1 January 2016, from the merger of Corpataux-Magnedens, Farvagny, Le Glèbe, Rossens and Vuisternens-en-Ogoz.

History
The village of Rossens is first mentioned in 1162 as Rossens.  It was formerly known by its German name Rossing, however, that name is no longer used.

Geography
Of this area, about 63.8% is used for agricultural purposes, while 23.9% is forested. Of the rest of the land, 11.6% is settled (buildings or roads) and 0.7% is unproductive land. Of the agricultural land,  is used for orchards and vineyards,  is fields and grasslands and  consists of alpine grazing areas. Rivers and lakes cover  in the municipality.

Demographics
, 15.2% of the population are resident foreign nationals. Over the last 4 years (2010-2014) the population has changed at a rate of 13.39%. The birth rate in the municipality, in 2014, was 8.7, while the death rate was 5.0 per thousand residents.

, children and teenagers (0–19 years old) make up 25.2% of the population, while adults (20–64 years old) are 62.7% of the population and seniors (over 64 years old) make up 12.1%.

In 2014 there were 2,812 private households in Gibloux with an average household size of 2.58 persons.  In 2013 the rate of construction of new housing units per 1000 residents was 7.42.  The vacancy rate for the municipality, was 1.94%.

Economy
Gibloux is classed as a periurbane community.  The municipality is part of the agglomeration of Fribourg.

, there were a total of 2,756 people employed in the municipality.  Of these, a total of 193 people worked in 82 businesses in the primary economic sector.  The secondary sector employed 1,102 workers in 93 separate businesses, of which 385 people worked in 4 large businesses.  Finally, the tertiary sector provided 1,461 jobs in 278 businesses, of which 564 people worked in 7 large businesses.

In 2014 a total of 7.4% of the population received social assistance.

Heritage sites of national significance
The ruin of Illens Castle, the Chapel of Notre-Dame and the Church of Saint-Vincent are listed as Swiss heritage site of national significance.

References

External links

 Official website 
 
 
 
 
 
 
 
 
 

Municipalities of the canton of Fribourg